From List of National Natural Landmarks, these are the National Natural Landmarks in New Mexico.  There are 12 in total.

New Mexico
New Mexico geography-related lists
National Park Service areas in New Mexico